Donja Dobra   is a village in the Gorski Kotar region of Croatia. The settlement is administered as a part of Brod Moravice municipality and the Primorje-Gorski Kotar County. According to the 2001 census the village has 190 inhabitants. It is connected by the D3 state road.

Sources

Populated places in Primorje-Gorski Kotar County